Big Radio 4 or Big Radio - Četvrti program (Domaćica) is a Bosnian local commercial radio station, broadcasting from Banja Luka, Bosnia and Herzegovina. This radio station broadcasts a variety of programs such as domestic Ex Yu pop music for all ages  and local news. The owner of the radio station is the company BIG RADIO d.o.o. Banja Luka.

After BHRT has abandoned the launch of the BH Radio 2 program, reserved frequencies were allocated to other interested stations across Bosnia and Herzegovina through the competition where Big Radio met the criteria for Big Radio 4 which was established in 2020.

Program of is mainly produced in Serbian language at one FM frequency (Banja Luka ) and it is available in the city of Banja Luka as well as in nearby municipalities Laktaši, Čelinac, Prnjavor, Bosanska Gradiška/Gradiška and Kotor Varoš.

Estimated number of listeners of Big Radio 4 is around 203.988.

Frequencies
 Banja Luka

See also 
 List of radio stations in Bosnia and Herzegovina
 Big Radio 2
 Radio A
 Pop FM
 RSG Radio

References

External links 
 www.bigradiobl.com
 www.bigportal.ba
 www.radiostanica.ba
 www.fmscan.org
 Communications Regulatory Agency of Bosnia and Herzegovina

Banja Luka
Radio stations established in 2020
Mass media in Banja Luka